Jufeng Road is a Shanghai Metro interchange station in Pudong, Shanghai, located at the intersection of North Zhangyang Road and Jufeng Road. It is served by Lines 6 and 12. It opened for passenger operations on 29 December 2007 with the opening of the initial phase of Line 6.

There is a small train depot at the northern end of the station, which holds trains that run short-turn trips on Line 6 between this station and  station.

Station layout

References 

Railway stations in Shanghai
Shanghai Metro stations in Pudong
Line 6, Shanghai Metro
Line 12, Shanghai Metro
Railway stations in China opened in 2007